Velloso is a surname. Notable people with the surname include:

Osvaldo Velloso de Barros (1908–1996), Brazilian footballer
Wagner Fernando Velloso (born 1968), Brazilian footballer, manager, and commentator

See also
Veloso